Esa Lepola (born 25 September 1948) is a Finnish former swimmer. He competed in the men's 1500 metre freestyle at the 1964 Summer Olympics.

References

External links
 

1948 births
Living people
Finnish male freestyle swimmers
Olympic swimmers of Finland
Swimmers at the 1964 Summer Olympics
Swimmers from Helsinki